Poultry refers to domesticated birds kept by humans for their eggs, meat, feathers, or as pets.

Poultry may also refer to:

Poultry farming
Poultry (office), the office in a medieval household responsible for the purchase and preparation of poultry
Poultry, London, a street in the City of London, United Kingdom
Poultry Compter, a former prison located on the street